MS Gripsholm was an ocean liner, built in 1924 by Armstrong Whitworth in Newcastle-upon-Tyne, England, for the Swedish American Line for use in the Gothenburg-New York City run. She was of great historical importance as the first ship built for transatlantic express service as a diesel-powered motor vessel, rather than as a steamship.

Initial service
From 1927 onwards, the Gripsholm made transatlantic passenger crossings and regular recreational cruises. Gripsholm was one of the first ships to call at the Canadian Pier 21 immigration terminal in Halifax, Nova Scotia and made 101 trips with immigrants to Pier 21.

Exchange and repatriation ship

From 1942 to 1946, the United States Department of State chartered Gripsholm as an exchange and repatriation ship, carrying Japanese and German nationals to exchange points where she then picked up US and Canadian citizens (and British married to Americans or Canadians) to bring home to the USA and Canada.  She also made at least two voyages  repatriating British and Commonwealth POW's in the spring of 1944 to Belfast and summer of the same year to Liverpool. In this service she sailed under the auspices of the International Red Cross, with a Swedish captain and crew. The ship made 12 round trips, carrying a total of 27,712 repatriates. Exchanges took place at neutral ports; at Lourenço Marques (now Maputo) in Mozambique or Mormugoa (now Goa) in Portuguese India with the Japanese, and Stockholm or Lisbon with the Germans.

After the war, Gripsholm was used to deport inmates of US prisons to Italy and Greece.

Post-war service and renaming

The Swedish American Line sold Gripsholm to Norddeutscher Lloyd in 1954, who renamed her MS Berlin. As MS Berlin, the ship resumed Canadian immigration voyages to Pier 21 in Halifax, making 33 immigrant voyages before the ship was retired. An image of MS Berlin arriving at Pier 21 in 1957 became the centre image of the newly redesigned Canadian epassport in 2012.

The ship was sold for scrap in 1966.

Passengers of note

Regular service
 Ernest Hemingway, American novelist, short story writer, and journalist, sailed with wife Pauline Pfeiffer from Mombasa to Villefranch in early 1934, and again with her in January 1938 from Southampton to Nassau after his return from Spain reporting on the Spanish Civil War.
 Anton Koschany, Canadian news producer, W5, immigrated to Canada as a child on the sailing of March 22, 1956 from Bremerhaven, in company of his mother and sister.
 Count Zsigmond (Sigismund) Széchenyi, Hungarian hunter and writer, sailed from Mombasa to Villefranch in early 1934 after his hounting expedition in East-Africa.

Exchange and repatriation ship
 Joseph Alsop, not as a Naval Press Officer stranded in Hong Kong, but as a news reporter.
 Gilberto Bosques, Mexican Consul General in Marseille, credited with issuing 40,000 visas to fleeing Spanish Republicans, Jews and other persecuted individuals in 1939-1943, on board (with his wife and 3 children) the MS Gripsholm sailing from Lisbon March 6, 1944, after having been imprisoned at the Rheinhotel Dreesen in Bad Godesberg for one year. 
 Cornell Franklin, former Chairman of the Shanghai Municipal Council, was repatriated from Shanghai in 1943, taking the Gripsholm from Goa.
 Joseph Grew, US Ambassador to Japan, was repatriated from Tokyo in 1942, taking the Gripsholm from Lourenço Marques.
 Milton Helmick, judge of the United States Court for China, was repatriated from Shanghai in 1942, taking the Gripsholm from Lourenço Marques.
 Olive Ireland Hodges, longtime principal and missionary teacher at Yokohama Eiwa Girls School
 Saburō Kurusu, Japanese peace envoy who was in the US when Pearl Harbor was attacked, was repatriated to Japan via Lourenço Marques in 1942.
 Pedro Inzunza McKay, Mexican diplomat, native of Mocorito, Sinaloa, subsequently Mexico's ambassador in Cuba and Brazil, on board the MS Gripsholm, with his French wife Marie Louise, sailing from Lisbon March 6, 1944, after having been imprisoned at the Rheinhotel Dreesen in Bad Godesberg for one year.
 Gregon A. Williams, Marine Corps Officer; Assistant Naval Attaché in Shanghai, was repatriated from Shanghai in 1942.
 May De Sousa, American actress famous for operetta; was repatriated from Chapei Civilian Assembly Center in Shanghai in 1943.

References

External links
 The Great Ocean Liners: Gripsholm (I)
 A Tribute to the Swedish American Line: Gripsholm 1925-1954
  Fakta om Fartyg: MS Gripsholm (1925)
 US Navy pictures of use as exchange ship

History

1924 ships
Ships built on the River Tyne
Ocean liners
Cruise ships
Ships built by Armstrong Whitworth
Ships of Swedish American Line

de:Liste von Passagierschiffen mit Namen Berlin#Passagierschiff „Berlin“ (IV) von 1924